Orest Tarasovych Kuzyk (born 17 May 1995) is a Ukrainian professional footballer who plays as a winger for Chornomorets Odesa.

Club career

Dynamo Kyiv and loan to Hoverla Uzhhorod 
He spent most of his early career in the Ukrainian Premier League Reserves with Dynamo Kyiv and in July 2015 went on loan to Hoverla Uzhhorod in the Ukrainian Premier League, making his debut against FC Vorskla Poltava on 25 July.

FC Stal Kamianske
The following season, Kuzyk joined Stal Kamianske of the Ukrainian Premier League, appearing 37 times and scoring eight goals over two seasons.

PAS Giannina F.C.
On 8 June 2018, Kuzyk signed with Greek Super League side PAS Giannina.

Loan to SC Dnipro-1 
Having made only seven appearances for Giannina, Kuzyk was loaned out to SC Dnipro-1 in the Ukrainian First League on 14 January 2019. He made 11 appearances and scored four goals in the 2018–19 Ukrainian First League, winning Player of the Month honours in March and ultimately helping Dnipro earn promotion to the Ukrainian Premier League.

Loan to FC Desna Chernihiv 
On 14 July 2019, he went on loan again, this time to Desna Chernihiv. There he found more consistent playing time, appearing in 21 matches and scoring once in the 2019–20 Ukrainian Premier League season.

Pafos FC 
In September 2020, Kuzyk left Giannina and signed a three-year contract with Pafos in the Cypriot First Division. On 22 October he scored his first goal for the side against Karmiotissa FC.

Rukh Lviv 
On 24 June 2021 he signed a three-year contract with Rukh Lviv in Ukrainian Premier League. On 25 July he made his debut with the new club against Metalist 1925 Kharkiv, also scoring his first goal.

Chornomorets Odesa 
On 26 January 2022, he moved to Chornomorets Odesa in the Ukrainian Premier League.

International career 
In 2015 he made two appearances for Ukraine's under-20s. The following year, he made five appearances and scored one goal for the Ukraine under-21 side.

Career statistics

Club

Honours
SC Dnipro-1
 Ukrainian First League: 2018-19

individual
 Best Player in March 2019 Ukrainian First League: 2018–19

References

External links
 From Official the website of FC Desna Chernihiv
 From Official the website of FC Pafos
 
 Video from the Official Channel of PAS Giannina 
 

1995 births
Sportspeople from Lviv
Association football midfielders
FC Desna Chernihiv players
FC Dynamo Kyiv players
FC Hoverla Uzhhorod players
FC Stal Kamianske players
Living people
PAS Giannina F.C. players
SC Dnipro-1 players
FC Rukh Lviv players
FC Chornomorets Odesa players
Super League Greece players
Cypriot First Division players
Ukrainian expatriate footballers
Expatriate footballers in Greece
Ukrainian expatriate sportspeople in Greece
Ukrainian footballers
Ukrainian Premier League players
Ukrainian First League players
Pafos FC players
Ukrainian expatriate sportspeople in Cyprus
Expatriate footballers in Cyprus
Ukraine youth international footballers
Ukraine under-21 international footballers